Christian Sivebæk (born 19 February 1988) is a retired Danish professional footballer.

He is son of the former Denmark international, John Sivebæk.

Career

Club
Sivebæk began his youth career with Vejle Boldklub . In 2005, he signed his first professional contract with FC Midtjylland and made his first team debut with the club in 2006. He  made his Danish Superliga debut on 6 August 2006, replacing Claus Madsen in a 2-5 victory at the grounds of his former club Vejle. During the 2007 season he was sent on loan to Skive IK to gain more experience. The following season, he returned to Midtjylland and began to display some of his great potential. On 23 March 2008 he scored his first goal for Midtjylland, in 3-2 defeat at Aalborg.

On 11 January 2012 it was announced that Sivebæk would be joining Seattle Sounders FC in Major League Soccer.  He made his Sounders debut on 17 March 2012 in a 3-1 win in the season opener against Toronto FC.

On 20 June 2012 the Sounders waived Sivebæk after only making three appearances for the club.

On 7 October 2020, 32-year old Sivebæk announced his retirement from football.

International
Sivebæk has represented Denmark at various youth levels from the Under-18 to the Under-21 side. He represented the Denmark national under-21 football team on five occasions making his debut in 2009.

References

 Vejle lejer Christian Sivebæk i Viborg, bold.dk, 13 January 2016

External links
 
 National team profile
 Official Danish league stats
 

1988 births
Living people
Danish men's footballers
Danish expatriate men's footballers
Denmark youth international footballers
Denmark under-21 international footballers
FC Midtjylland players
Skive IK players
Seattle Sounders FC players
Vejle Boldklub Kolding players
Viborg FF players
Christian Sivebaek
Danish 1st Division players
Danish Superliga players
Major League Soccer players
Association football midfielders
Danish expatriate sportspeople in the United States
Danish expatriate sportspeople in Iceland
Expatriate soccer players in the United States
Expatriate footballers in Iceland
People from Vejle Municipality
Sportspeople from the Region of Southern Denmark